Murray Barnes (16 January 1954 – 31 December 2011) was an Australian soccer player. Barnes played for the Australian team for six years, captaining the team nine times.

Playing career

Club career 
Barnes played for a number of junior soccer clubs including Northern Tigers and Kissing Point in New South Wales. He also spent a year with the youth team of English club Leeds United. During his senior club career Barnes played for Sydney Hakoah (later known as Sydney City Soccer Club) in the New South Wales State League and in the National Soccer League.

International career 
He played 32 full international games for the national side scoring six goals. He was captain of the Socceroos for nine matches between 1978 and 1981 including World Cup qualifiers against New Zealand, Fiji, Chinese Taipei and Indonesia.

Death
Murray died on 31 December 2011, at the age of 57.

Honours
Barnes received the Football Hall of Fame (Australia), Award of Distinction. When Football Federation Australia created the Socceroo Club made up of former national team members in 2008, Barnes was announced as a founding member.

See also 
Football Hall of Fame (Australia)
Australia national association football team

References

External links
 OzFootball profile

1954 births
Australia international soccer players
National Soccer League (Australia) players
Sydney City players
2011 deaths
Leeds United F.C. players
Association football midfielders
Soccer players from Sydney
Australian soccer players